The Niagara Gazette, also referred to as The Gazette, is a morning daily newspaper published in Niagara Falls, New York, United States, which covers several parts of Niagara County, including the Town of Niagara, and the City of Niagara Falls.

History

The Gazette was founded in 1854 as the Niagara Falls Gazette.

The Gazette was owned by Gannett from 1954 to 1997. Gannett was formed in 1923 by Frank Gannett, a noted conservative, in Rochester, New York as an outgrowth of a newspaper business he had begun in Elmira, New York in 1906.

In a 1996 deal, that closed in 1997, Gannett acquired Buffalo's WGRZ. Due to U.S. Federal Communications Commission regulations, Gannett was required to sell the paper. It was bought by Community Newspaper Holdings Inc., along with other area newspapers such as the Lockport Union-Sun & Journal and the former Tonawanda News.

Daily price
Niagara Gazette prices are: daily, $1.50 & Weekend/Thanksgiving Day, $3. Rates higher outside Niagara and adjacent counties.

See also
The Buffalo News
Niagara Falls Reporter

References

External links
 Niagara Gazette Website
 CNHI Website
 Niagara Gazette newspapers on microfilm at NYSL

Daily newspapers published in New York (state)
Niagara County, New York